Anna Karenina is a ballet choreographed by Boris Eifman, based on the 1877 novel Anna Karenina by Leo Tolstoy. The première took place in Saint Petersburg on Saturday, 2 April 2005. The music is by Pyotr Ilyich Tchaikovsky and includes excerpts from:

 Symphony No. 2 in C minor Little Russian, Op. 17 
 The Tempest symphonic fantasy, Op. 18 
 Francesca da Rimini symphonic fantasy, Op. 32
 Souvenir d'un lieu cher, Op. 42
Scherzo. Presto giocoso
  Suite No. 1 in D major, Op. 43
Andante sostenuto, moderato e con anima
Intermezzo: part 3. Andante semplice
 Serenade for Strings in C, Op. 48
Andante non troppo. Allegro moderato
 Suite No. 3 in G, Op. 55 
 Manfred Symphony in B minor, Op. 58
 Hamlet, overture-fantasy, Op. 67a
 Souvenir de Florence, string sextet in D minor, Op. 70
Adagio cantabile e con moto
 Symphony No. 6 in B minor Pathetique, Op. 74
 The Voyevoda symphonic ballad, Op. 78
 Romeo and Juliet fantasy-overture

See also
 List of ballets by title

References
 The Social Affairs Unit
 Anna Karenina: Music by Tchaikovsky

Ballets by Boris Eifman
Ballets to the music of Pyotr Ilyich Tchaikovsky
2005 ballet premieres
Adaptations of works by Leo Tolstoy